Walter George may refer to:

 Walter George (athlete) (1858–1943), British runner
 Walter George (cricketer) (1847–1938), English cricketer
 Walter F. George (1878–1957), U.S. Senator and judge from the state of Georgia
 W. L. George (1882–1926), English writer
 Walter Sykes George (1881–1962), English architect
 Wally George (1931–2003), American conservative radio and television commentator

See also

George Walter (disambiguation)